Anoplotettix is a genus of leafhoppers belonging to the family Cicadellidae subfamily Deltocephalinae.

Species
 Anoplotettix androsinus
 Anoplotettix beieri
 Anoplotettix bitaeniatus
 Anoplotettix cruciatus
 Anoplotettix danutae
 Anoplotettix eckerleini
 Anoplotettix emeljanovi
 Anoplotettix etnensis
 Anoplotettix eubeaticus
 Anoplotettix fastuosus
 Anoplotettix fuscovenosus
 Anoplotettix golestanicus
 Anoplotettix graecus
 Anoplotettix guilanicus
 Anoplotettix horvathi
 Anoplotettix hyrcanus
 Anoplotettix ibericus
 Anoplotettix kalkandeleni
 Anoplotettix kofleri
 Anoplotettix kurdicus
 Anoplotettix lodosianus
 Anoplotettix loewii
 Anoplotettix magnificus
 Anoplotettix malickyi
 Anoplotettix novaki
 Anoplotettix putoni
 Anoplotettix remanei
 Anoplotettix rodosicus
 Anoplotettix sahtyiancii
 Anoplotettix samosinus

References

MOWD: Membracoidea of the World Database. McKamey S., 2010-11-23
Catalogue of Life
Biolib

Cicadellidae genera
Athysanini